Daniel Spassov, is a Bulgarian singer, performer of Bulgarian folklore songs and church music.

Biography
Daniel Spassov studied law at Sofia University (St. Kliment Ohridski) and received a Master's degree in Musical Folklore at New Bulgarian University.

The artistic biography of Daniel Spassov includes more than 250 recordings of folk music for Bulgarian National Radio, movies made for Bulgarian National Television, and four single CDs.

He is an editor for Bulgarian National Television and host of the TV folklore show "Goes our music". Over the years Daniel Spassov has been an author and presenter of the "News by notes", "Whistled and sang", "Word by word" at the folklore festival in Koprivshtitsa. Also he has made many portraits and some documentary movies for famous Bulgarian folklore musicians.

Solo projects

He has taken part in many concerts across Bulgaria, in solo concerts as well as a soloist of the world-famous choir The Mystery of Bulgarian Voices. He has performed in more than thirty countries, in some of the most prestigious concert halls in Europe, Asia and America :  „Royal festival Hall", „Barbican center", „Queen Elizabeth" – London, „Kennedy Center" – Washington, „Konzerthaus" – Vienna, „Concertgebouw" – Netherlands, the National opera's hall in Tel Aviv, and in Oman's Royal opera house. In 2000 his performance of the church song "In your realm",( music composed by Dobri Hristov), and two more songs of „The Mystery of Bulgarian Voices" were included in the international bridge "Vaticano greets the World for the 21st century". As a soloist of the choir he performed at the concert in Torino, Italy, in front of the G-7 leaders (the seven most developed countries in the world), at the special ceremony held on the occasion of signing the contract of Bulgaria's Treaty of Accession to the European Union, in Luxembourg, 2005 and in 2002 on the occasion of Pope John Paul II's visit to Bulgaria.

Daniel Spassov`s voice is heard in many documentary films, in TV arts programs that  introduce Bulgaria's cultural and historical heritage, including those of the director Stiliyan Ivanov: "Vanga", "The Healer Petar Dimkov". In 2012 he received a special invitation to take part in the International film production "Dervishes - Mystics of the East".

Projects with other performers

Daniel Spassov is renown also for his duets with Milen E. Ivanov ("Dvuglas" formation ("Two voices")) and with Olga Borisova (together they create the "Voices from the infinity" formation, in which sing E. Bojkova, M. Ivanov, K. Stancheva, R. Alexova and V. Kuzov). In 1995 the formation releases a series of albums, called "The voices from the infinity", that includes songs of all Bulgaria folklore regions. From 2011 the formation is composed of the following members – O. Borisova, V. Marinova, D. Spasov, M. Ivanov and S. Ivanov.
With Olga Borisova and Ivan Todorov they release the album, composed of old city songs – "Anna's kiss" (1995).

Projects with Milen Ivanov
Since 1998, Spassov has worked with Milen E. Ivanov. Their creative endeavors have been related to Bulgarian two-part singing. They search out and record samples of the most ancient strata of Bulgarian folklore. Often they experiment, superimposing voices, and creating modern music. 
In 2003 they released their first album with rebel, historical and Renaissance songs and in 2005 they presented the album "Bulgarian Diaphonic Singing". They give many concerts in Bulgaria and solo tours abroad – Austria, Germany, Sweden, Denmark, Czech Republic, Israel, Corsica, Switzerland. In 2008 Spassov and Ivanov released an album with ancient Bulgarian Orthodox Church songs, titled "Thou Art Blessed, Lord". In 2009 they released the album "Christmas Blessing". The duo's project, "The Mystery of the Ritual," released in 2012, included ritual songs of Bulgarian celebrations.
In 2011 Daniel Spassov and Milen Ivanov along with "The Mystery of Bulgarian Voices" made recordings in BBC Radio, London. In 2012 together with "Eva Quartet" they gave a concert in Berlin Philharmonic under the motto "Music from the monasteri".

Svetoglas 

In 2009 Daniel Spassov, Milen E. Ivanov, Stanimir Ivanov and Victor Tomanov created the male folklore formation Svetoglas. The formation's endeavors are related to the ancient Bulgarian church and folklore music and its contemporary sound.  Svetoglas's first musical project was called „The wheel of life".
In April, 2013, the Svetoglas Quartet made a one-month tour in Russia, performing in  Yekaterinburg, Tolyatti, Perm, Vologda, and Samara. In July, 2013 Svetoglas received a special invitation to take part in the festival "Music of faith" in Kazan, Russia. In September, the same year, the quartet sang at the "Thracian Gold from Bulgaria – the Legends Come to Life" exhibition's opening ceremony at the State Historical Museum in Moscow. In February, 2014 the singers gave a concert in Brussels, in the European Commission's building.
The formation has held successful tours to Russia, Great Britain, Norway, Belgium, Spain and Colombia. They took part in the International Liturgical music festival in Drammen, Norway, the church music festival - „Maestro de la Roza" in Oviedo, Spain; the international music festival  in Cartagena (Colombia), the "Three cultures" festival in Murcia, Spain; the international church music festival „Fausto Flamini" in Rome; the "Earth music" festival in Ceriana, Italy and in a concert in the "Juan March" Foundation's prestigious hall in Madrid, Spain.

Recognition and awards
In 1994 Daniel Spassov's name was included in the World encyclopedia "Music of the world", published in London.
On 24 May 2014, for his contribution to Bulgaria's cultural development, he was awarded with the honourable sign of the Ministry of culture „Golden century" – Simeon The Great's seal.

Discography
Solo albums:
 1987 – Songs from Belogradchik, single play
 1990 – Swan wings, single play
 1992 – Folklore sound and light, long play
 1994 – On the road of fire – favourite folklore songs
 1995 – Christmas, my Christmas – Christmas songs from all over Bulgaria
 1996 – Give me, O, God
 2000 – Holly Mother's Prayer 
 2001 – Here Comes the Brass Band 
 2008 – Northwest worlds
Daniel Spassov and Milen Ivanov
 2003 – Historical and Renaissance songs 
 2005 – Bulgarian Diaphonic Singing 
 2008 – Thou Art Blessed, Lord
 2012 – The Mystery of the Ritual 
 2012 – Christmas Blessing 
 2016 – Bulgaria's eternal songs 
Svetoglas
 2012 – The Wheel of life
 2016 – Molenie Gospodne
Participation in albums of "The mystery of Bulgarian voices"
 1994 – Ritual
 1998 – Le Mystère Des Voix Bulgares – Volume 4
 2000 – Le Mystère Des Voix Bulgares
 2006 – Le Mystère Des Voix Bulgares
 2008 – Golden collection

External links 
 Svetoglas' official website
 Dvuglas'official website
 SoundCloud
 Daniel Spassov's You Tube channel

References 

Anthology of Bulgarian Folk Music
 Daniel Spassov in Encyclopedia World Music
CD The Arch
Friends of Bulgaria
CD Here Comes the Brass Band
Film Here Comes the Brass Band
Daniel Spassov soloist of Le Mystère des Voix Bulgares
Daniel Spassov & Milen Ivanov
BBC Radio
 BNT1 TV folklore show Goes our music
  Dervishes - mystic of the east
 CD "Le Mystère des Voix Bulgares"
 Bulgarian styles of Folk Singing
CD "Le Mystère des Voix Bulgares"
 http://archive.rockpaperscissors.biz/index.cfm/fuseaction/current.articles_detail/project_id/299/article_id/6819.cfm
 https://www.walesartsreview.org/festival-of-voice-le-mystere-des-voix-bulgares/

Bulgarian folk singers
21st-century Bulgarian male singers
Living people
20th-century Bulgarian male singers
Performers of Christian music
Year of birth missing (living people)